Brdárka is a village and municipality in the Rožňava District in the Košice Region of eastern Slovakia.

Genealogical resources

The records for genealogical research are available at the state archive "Statny Archiv in Banska Bystrica, Kosice, Slovakia"

 Greek Catholic church records (births/marriages/deaths): 1818-1895 (parish B)
 Lutheran church records (births/marriages/deaths): 1744-1952 (parish B)

See also
 List of municipalities and towns in Slovakia

External links
Surnames of living people in Brdarka

Villages and municipalities in Rožňava District